Leontopodium palibinianum is a species of plant in the family Asteraceae. It is native to the Sikhote-Alin mountains, Russia.

References

palibinianum